The Battle of the Teutoburg Forest, described as the Varian Disaster by Roman historians, took place at modern Kalkriese in AD 9, when an alliance of Germanic peoples ambushed Roman legions and their auxiliaries, led by Publius Quinctilius Varus. The alliance was led by Arminius, a Germanic officer of Varus's auxilia. Arminius had acquired Roman citizenship and had received a Roman military education, which enabled him to deceive the Roman commander methodically and anticipate the Roman army's tactical responses.

Teutoburg Forest is commonly seen as one of the most important defeats in Roman history, bringing the triumphant period of expansion under Augustus to an abrupt end. The outcome of this battle dissuaded the Romans from their ambition of conquering Germania, and is thus considered one of the most important events in European history. The provinces of Germania Superior and Germania Inferior, sometimes collectively referred to as Roman Germania, were subsequently established in northeast Roman Gaul, while territories beyond the Rhine remained independent of Roman control. Retaliatory campaigns were commanded by Tiberius and Germanicus and would enjoy success, but the Rhine would eventually become the border between the Roman Empire and the rest of Germania. The Roman Empire would launch no other major incursion into Germania until Marcus Aurelius (r. 161–180) during the Marcomannic Wars.

Some of the descendants of the vassal kingdoms, like the Suebi (by suzerainty), that Augustus tried to create in Germania to expand the romanitas and the Empire would be the ones that invaded the Empire in the fourth and fifth centuries.

Background

Geopolitical situation 
The Roman Republic had expanded rapidly in the first century BC, most notably under Julius Caesar, who had conquered most of western Europe and parts of the British Isles in the Gallic Wars (58–50 BC). The Gallic Wars mostly saw fighting against the Gauls, but had also included fighting against various Germanic tribes. Caesar had twice crossed the Rhine river to fight Germanic tribes, but the engagements were tactically inconclusive. Caesar's conquering spree was forced to an early end as Caesar's civil war (49–45 BC) drew near. Continental Europe was mostly forgotten about for the next two decades after the Gallic Wars as power struggles wracked the Republic. Troops which had previously garrisoned Gallic lands were pulled out in 31 BC for the climatic showdown between Octavian and Mark Antony at the Battle of Actium. The Gauls needed no further urging, and promptly rebelled. Roman control was not regained until 28 BC.

27 BC saw drastic change for both Gaul and Rome as a whole. The Roman Republic was reorganized into the Roman Empire, with Octavian declared as the first emperor. Octavian, now styled as Augustus, aimed to solidify control in Gaul, and divided Gaul into three smaller provinces. The reorganization emphasized the strategic importance of the Rhine valley. Troops were kept stationed near the Rhine. But Augustus's policy towards the Germanic lands remains unclear. Two main theories exist. The first holds that Augustus sought to cement the Rhine as the Northern border of the Empire. The second holds that the border was far more fluid, and that the troops were more focused on maintaining order in the Empire, rather than preventing Germanic intrusion. At any rate, the Germans operated with seeming impunity, exemplified by the crushing defeat in the Clades Lolliana in 16 BC.

The defeat of Roman forces in the Lollian disaster prompted reorganization of the Legions in Gaul, which was finished by 12 BC. Augustus now sought to tame the Germanic tribes, and began planning a Germanic campaign. He assigned his stepson Drusus I as the governor of Gaul. Drusus campaigned against the Germans from 11–9 BC, earning a continuous series of victories despite considerable obstacles. Drusus's untimely death due to a riding accident in 9 BC again stopped expansion into the Germanic tribes. His elder brother, and future emperor Tiberius was given command of Germany in 8 BC. Tiberius continued his brother's campaign against the Sugambri, extending de facto, if not de jure Roman rule. But Tiberius fell out of favor and chose voluntary exile in 6 BC. He was succeeded by Lucius Domitius Ahenobarbus, who had been consul in 16 BC. Ahenobarbus subjugated a number of local uprisings, and crossed the Elbe river, the first and last Roman general to do so. As the turn of the century approached, the Romans were lulled into a false sense of security about the Germanic lands, reassured by thriving cross border trade with the Germans, and relative peace.

In early AD 6, Legatus Gaius Sentius Saturninus and Consul Legatus Marcus Aemilius Lepidus led a massive army of 13 legions and their entourage, totaling around 100,000 men (65,000 heavy infantry legionaries, 10,000–20,000 cavalrymen, archers, and 10,000–20,000 civilians) against Maroboduus, the king of the Marcomanni, who were a tribe of the Suebi.

Tiberius was then forced to turn his attention to the Bellum Batonianum, also known as the Great Illyrian Revolt, which broke out in the Balkan province of Illyricum. Led by Bato the Daesitiate, Bato the Breucian, Pinnes of Pannonia, and elements of the Marcomanni, it lasted nearly four years. Tiberius was forced to stop his campaign against Maroboduus and recognise him as king so that he could then send his eight legions (VIII Augusta, XV Apollinaris, XX Valeria Victrix, XXI Rapax, XIII Gemina, XIV Gemina, XVI Gallica and an unknown unit) to crush the rebellion in the Balkans.

After his return from Rome, Arminius became a trusted advisor to Varus, but in secret he forged an alliance of Germanic peoples that had traditionally been enemies. These probably included the Cherusci, Marsi, Chatti, and Bructeri. These were some of the fifty Germanic tribes at the time. Using the collective outrage over Varus' tyrannous insolence and wanton cruelty to the conquered, Arminius was able to unite the disorganized groups who had submitted in sullen hatred to the Roman dominion, and maintain the alliance until the most opportune moment to strike. Following the transfer of eight of eleven legions present in Germania to the Balkans, only three legions faced the Germanic tribesmen. This represented the perfect opportunity for Arminius to defeat Varus. While Varus was on his way from his summer camp west of the River Weser to winter headquarters near the Rhine, he heard reports of a local rebellion, reports which had been fabricated by Arminius. Edward Shepherd Creasy writes that "This was represented to Varus as an occasion which required his prompt attendance on the spot; but he was kept in studied ignorance of its being part of a concerted national rising; and he still looked on Arminius as his submissive vassal".

Commanders and their armies

Publius Quinctilius Varus 
The Varian disaster owes its name to Publius Quinctilius Varus, the ill-fated Roman commander. Varus was a promising leader: Emperor Augustus appointed him as quaestor in 22 BC as a young man even though the office usually required one to be at least 30. He went on to command the XIX legion in 15 BC, and was elected junior consul. He was appointed governor of Africa in 8 BC, and of Syria in 7 BC. The Syrian posting was considered prestigious and was a very difficult job due to the political struggles in the Eastern Empire and its border nations. Varus proved himself a capable governor, acting to solve the succession crisis after the death of Herod the Great in 4 BC. His ultimate performance as governor is disputed by contemporary sources. Josephus (writing some decades after the fact) gives a positive view of Varus, whereas Velleius Paterculus implicitly accuses Varus of corruption in office. At any rate, Varus married the Emperor's great-niece after his term as governor ended, ensuring him a spot in the Emperor's inner circle. Varus likely remained with the Emperor in Rome until his appointment to the command in Germania in 7 AD.

Varus's name and deeds were well known beyond the empire because of his ruthlessness and crucifixion of insurgents. While he was feared by the people, he was highly respected by the Roman Senate. On the Rhine, he was in command of the XVII, XVIII, and XIX legions.

Varus initially commanded five legions plus auxiliaries in Germania. In the early imperial period each legion at full strength had 4,800 men supported by 120 light escort/scouting cavalry. Combined usually with a group of engineers and officers, a legion was roughly 5,000 fighting men. This did not include the 1,200 non-combatant servants that were integrated into the legion. Varus's initial command of about 25,000 (not counting auxilliaries) represented some 20% of the Roman frontline army.  But it is unclear how many men were truly under his command at the Battle of the Teutoburg Forest; estimates generally range from 20,000 to 30,000. Of his five starting legions, only three were under his command at the battle (~15,000 men), supported by nine small auxiliary units (~4,500 men). Winter attrition due to casualties, illness, and other causes would have sapped the legions' strength. The Roman historian Cassius Dio assumed that a large number of civilians were part of the camp following. But historian McNally finds this unlikely. Recent reforms had required that legionaries be unmarried, which meant that families were no longer part of the camp following. McNally puts the likely number of civilians at a few hundred, mostly merchants who would have followed the army knowing that their goods would be of considerable value during the long campaigning season. McNally, assuming 10% winter attrition, and an auxiliary force of about 4,000 after attrition, comes up 17,000 combatants, supported by roughly 3,800 servant non-combatants. Combined with the civilians, the army would have numbered about 21,000 at the start of campaigning. But this number was probably less by the time of the battle, as further attrition combined with the need to detach garrisons along the way would have sapped the army's strength.

The main Roman army was highly professional and outfitted by the state. They were given standardized weapons and armor, consisting of a gladius (shortsword), a large shield, a pilum (javelin), a helmet, a mail shirt, and some segmented armor. The auxiliary units were not outfitted by the Romans, and instead would have represented the equipment and fighting styles of their homelands, which would have put them much on par with the Germanic troops.

Arminius 
The Germanic coalition was led by Arminius, of the Cherusci tribe. Arminius was in a unique place to understand Roman tactics and strategy: though he was born in Germania, he was taken hostage by the Romans after Drusus defeated the tribe in combat in 8 BC, when Arminius would have been about 10 years old. He received an aristocratic education in Rome, as he was the son of a nobleman, even if he was a hostage. When he came of age, he joined the ordo equester (the Roman cavalry), which would later lead to his appointment as a commander of Roman auxiliaries. By 4 AD he was serving in Pannonia (in the northwestern Balkan states). Soon after, he returned to his homeland in Germania, still nominally loyal to Rome.

Historian McNally suggests that two important events shaped Arminius's view of the Romans: an ambush in 11 BC led by the Cherusci against Drusus, and Drusus' victory over the Cherusci in 8 BC. In the ambush in 11 BC, the Cherusci had trapped Drusus' army in unfavorable terrain, and the Romans escaped only with great difficulty. Drusus' victory in 8 BC would have been unforgettable to Arminius, who had been made a hostage because of it. From these events, McNally argues that Arminius surmised a key lesson: "the Romans could be defeated, but only in a situation where their tactical flexibility and discipline could not be brought to bear."

The size of Arminius's forces is a guessing game at best since no written records of the Germanic peoples survive. Estimates thus vary widely based on the starting assumptions. Historian Adrian Murdoch suggests a force of 25,000. Historian Peter Wells suggests that the army may have pulled from a large area, and gives a range of estimates between 17,000 and 100,000, but suggests that 18,000 were likely involved at the final stage of the battle when the Romans were routed. Historian McNally finds fault with Well's demographic calculation style, finding his upper estimate of 100,000 to be very unlikely. Historian Hans Delbrück suggested that each tribe involved probably had 6,000 to 8,000 fighting men, for a total in the 20,000 to 30,000 range.

Delbrück notes that these troops were not just mere farmers, they were experienced soldiers in their own right, even if not outfitted by the state as the Romans were. But the Germanic army was generally more poorly outfitted than the Romans. Most had no armor and would have been limited to a simple shield and a hunting spear or axe. But there was a gradation in equipment quality according to the wealth and status of the fighter. Those fighters who would have held command roles, or been part of a chief's guard would have carried a heavy spear and a number of javelins, along with various other secondary weapons. Those fighters would also have had high quality shields. Still, armor was very rare and would had to have been acquired as spoils of war from defeated Romans, or perhaps from time serving as a Roman auxiliary.

Battles

Varus' forces included his three legions (Legio XVII, Legio XVIII and Legio XIX), six cohorts of auxiliary troops (non-citizens or allied troops) and three squadrons of cavalry (alae).  Most of these lacked combat experience, both with regard to Germanic fighters and under the prevalent local conditions. The Roman forces were not marching in combat formation and were interspersed with large numbers of camp followers. As they entered the forest northeast of Osnabrück, they found the track narrow and muddy. According to Cassius Dio, a violent storm had also arisen. He also writes that Varus neglected to send out reconnaissance parties ahead of the main body of troops.

It was in this state when it came under attack by Germanic warriors armed with swords, large lances and narrow-bladed short spears called fremae. The attackers surrounded the entire Roman army and rained down javelins on the intruders. Arminius, recalling his education in Rome, understood his enemies' tactics and was able to direct his troops to counter them effectively by using locally superior numbers against the dispersed Roman legions. The Romans managed to set up a fortified night camp and, in the next morning, broke out into the open country north of the Wiehen Hills, near the modern town of Ostercappeln. The break-out was accompanied by heavy losses to the Roman survivors, as was a further attempt to escape by marching through another forested area, as the torrential rains continued.

The Romans undertook a night march to escape, but marched into another trap that Arminius had set at the foot of Kalkriese Hill. The road was further blocked by a trench and, towards the forest, an earthen wall had been built along the roadside, permitting the Germanic alliance to attack the Romans from cover. The Romans made a desperate attempt to storm the wall, but failed, and the highest-ranking officer next to Varus, Legatus Numonius Vala, abandoned the troops by riding off with the cavalry. His retreat was in vain, however, as he was overtaken by the Germanic cavalry and killed shortly thereafter, according to Velleius Paterculus. The Germanic warriors then stormed the field and slaughtered the disintegrating Roman forces. Varus committed suicide, and Velleius reports that one commander, Praefectus Ceionius, surrendered, then later took his own life, while his colleague Praefectus Eggius died leading his doomed troops.

Roman casualties have been estimated at 15,000–20,000 dead, and many of the officers were said to have taken their own lives by falling on their swords in the approved manner. Tacitus wrote that many officers were sacrificed by the Germanic forces as part of their indigenous religious ceremonies, cooked in pots and their bones used for rituals. Others were ransomed and some common soldiers appear to have been enslaved.

All Roman accounts stress the completeness of the Roman defeat, and the finds at Kalkriese of 6,000 pieces of Roman equipment, but only a single item that is clearly Germanic (part of a spur), suggest few Germanic losses. However, the victors would most likely have removed the bodies of their fallen and their practice of burying their warriors' battle gear with them would have contributed to the lack of Germanic relics. Additionally, as many as several thousand Germanic soldiers were deserting militiamen and wore Roman armour, and thus would appear to be "Roman" in the archaeological digs. It is known, too, that the Germanic peoples wore perishable organic material, such as leather, and less metal than the Roman legionaries.

The victory was followed by a clean sweep of all Roman forts, garrisons and cities (of which there were at least two) east of the Rhine; the two Roman legions remaining in Germania, commanded by Varus' nephew Lucius Nonius Asprenas, simply tried to hold the Rhine. One fort, Aliso, most likely located in today's Haltern am See, fended off the Germanic alliance for many weeks, perhaps even a few months.  After the situation became untenable, the garrison under Lucius Caedicius, accompanied by survivors of Teutoburg Forest, broke through the siege and reached the Rhine. They had resisted long enough for Nonius Asprenas to have organized the Roman defence on the Rhine with two legions and Tiberius to have arrived with a new army, together preventing Arminius from crossing the Rhine and invading Gaul.

Aftermath

Upon hearing of the defeat, the Emperor Augustus, according to the Roman historian Suetonius in The Twelve Caesars, was so shaken that he stood butting his head against the walls of his palace, repeatedly shouting:

The legion numbers XVII, XVIII and XIX were not used again by the Romans. This was in contrast to other legions that were reestablished after suffering defeat.

The battle abruptly ended the period of triumphant Roman expansion that followed the end of the Civil Wars forty years earlier. Augustus' stepson Tiberius took effective control, and prepared for the continuation of the war. Legio II Augusta, XX Valeria Victrix and XIII Gemina were sent to the Rhine to replace the lost legions.

Arminius sent Varus' severed head to Maroboduus, king of the Marcomanni, the other most powerful Germanic ruler, with the offer of an anti-Roman alliance. Maroboduus declined, sending the head to Rome for burial, and remained neutral throughout the ensuing war. Only thereafter did a brief, inconclusive war break out between the two Germanic leaders.

Roman retaliation

Germanicus' campaign against the Germanic coalition

Though the shock at the slaughter was enormous, the Romans immediately began a slow, systematic process of preparing for the reconquest of the country. In 14 AD, just after Augustus' death and the accession of his heir and stepson Tiberius, a massive raid was conducted by the new emperor's nephew Germanicus. He attacked the Marsi with the element of surprise. The Bructeri, Tubanti and Usipeti were roused by the attack and ambushed Germanicus on the way to his winter quarters, but were defeated with heavy losses.

The next year was marked by two major campaigns and several smaller battles with a large army estimated at 55,000–70,000 men, backed by naval forces. In spring 15 AD, Legatus Caecina Severus invaded the Marsi a second time with about 25,000–30,000 men, causing great havoc. Meanwhile, Germanicus' troops had built a fort on Mount Taunus from where he marched with about 30,000–35,000 men against the Chatti. Many of the men fled across a river and dispersed themselves in the forests. Germanicus next marched on Mattium ("caput gentis", capital city) and burned it to the ground. After initial successful skirmishes in summer 15 AD, including the capture of Arminius' wife Thusnelda, the army visited the site of the first battle. According to Tacitus, they found heaps of bleached bones and severed skulls nailed to trees, which they buried, "...looking on all as kinsfolk and of their own blood...". At a location Tacitus calls the pontes longi ("long causeways"), in boggy lowlands somewhere near the Ems, Arminius' troops attacked the Romans. Arminius initially caught Germanicus' cavalry in a trap, inflicting minor casualties, but the Roman infantry reinforced the rout and checked them. The fighting lasted for two days, with neither side achieving a decisive victory. Germanicus' forces withdrew and returned to the Rhine.

Under Germanicus, the Romans marched another army, along with allied Germanic auxiliaries, into Germania in 16 AD. He forced a crossing of the Weser near modern Minden, suffering some losses to a Germanic skirmishing force, and forced Arminius' army to stand in open battle at Idistaviso in the Battle of the Weser River. Germanicus' legions inflicted huge casualties on the Germanic armies while sustaining only minor losses. A final battle was fought at the Angrivarian Wall west of modern Hanover, repeating the pattern of high Germanic fatalities, which forced them to flee beyond the Elbe. Germanicus, having defeated the forces between the Rhine and the Elbe, then ordered Caius Silius to march against the Chatti with a mixed force of three thousand cavalry and thirty thousand infantry and lay waste to their territory, while Germanicus, with a larger army, invaded the Marsi for the third time and devastated their land, encountering no resistance.

With his main objectives reached and winter approaching, Germanicus ordered his army back to their winter camps, with the fleet incurring some damage from a storm in the North Sea. Afterwards, a few more raids across the Rhine resulted in the recovery of two of the three legions' eagles lost in 9 AD: one Legion Eagle was recovered from the Marsi in 14 AD; the Legion XIX Eagle was recovered from the Bructeri in 15 AD by troops under Lucius Stertinius. Tiberius ordered the Roman forces to halt and withdraw across the Rhine. Germanicus was recalled to Rome and informed by Tiberius that he would be given a triumph and reassigned to a new command.

Germanicus' campaign had been taken to avenge the Teutoburg slaughter and also partially in reaction to indications of mutinous intent amongst his troops. Arminius, who had been considered a very real threat to stability by Rome, was now defeated. Once his Germanic coalition had been broken and honour avenged, the huge cost and risk of keeping the Roman army operating beyond the Rhine was not worth any likely benefit to be gained. Tacitus, with some bitterness, claims that Tiberius' decision to recall Germanicus was driven by his jealousy of the glory Germanicus had acquired, and that an additional campaign the next summer would have concluded the war and facilitated a Roman occupation of territories between the Rhine and the Elbe.

Later campaigns

The third legionary standard was recovered in 41 AD by Publius Gabinius from the Chauci during the reign of Claudius, brother of Germanicus. Possibly the recovered aquilae were placed within the Temple of Mars Ultor ("Mars the Avenger"), the ruins of which stand today in the Forum of Augustus by the Via dei Fori Imperiali in Rome.

The last chapter was recounted by the historian Tacitus. Around 50 AD, bands of Chatti invaded Roman territory in Germania Superior, possibly an area in Hesse east of the Rhine that the Romans appear to have still held, and began to plunder. The Roman commander, Publius Pomponius Secundus, and a legionary force supported by Roman cavalry recruited auxiliaries from the Vangiones and Nemetes. They attacked the Chatti from both sides and defeated them, and joyfully found and liberated Roman prisoners, including some from Varus' legions who had been held for 40 years.

Arminius would continue to fight against the Romans, but the conflict remained a stalemate. He was poisoned by his fellow Germans in 21 AD, possibly by his own family, who feared his increasing autocracy.

Impact on Roman expansion

From the time of the rediscovery of Roman sources in the 15th century, the Battles of the Teutoburg Forest have been seen as a pivotal event resulting in the end of Roman expansion into northern Europe. This theory became prevalent in the 19th century, and formed an integral part of the mythology of German nationalism.

More recently some scholars questioned this interpretation, advancing a number of reasons why the Rhine was a practical boundary for the Roman Empire, and more suitable than any other river in Germania. Logistically, armies on the Rhine could be supplied from the Mediterranean via the Rhône, Saône and Mosel, with a brief stretch of portage. Armies on the Elbe, on the other hand, would have to be supplied either by extensive overland routes or ships travelling the hazardous Atlantic seas. Economically, the Rhine was already supporting towns and sizeable villages at the time of the Gallic conquest. Northern Germania was far less developed, possessed fewer villages, and had little food surplus and thus a far lesser capacity for tribute. Thus the Rhine was both significantly more accessible from Rome and better suited to supply sizeable garrisons than the regions beyond. There were also practical reasons to fall back from the limits of Augustus' expansionism in this region. The Romans were mostly interested in conquering areas that had a high degree of self-sufficiency which could provide a tax base for them to extract from. Most of Germania Magna did not have the higher level of urbanism at this time as in comparison with some Celtic Gallic settlements, which were in many ways already integrated into the Roman trade network in the case of southern Gaul. In a cost/benefit analysis, the prestige to be gained by conquering more territory was outweighed by the lack of financial benefits accorded to conquest.

The Teutoburg Forest myth is noteworthy in 19th century Germanic interpretations as to why the "march of the Roman Empire" was halted, but in reality Roman punitive campaigns into Germania continued and they were intended less for conquest or expansion than they were to force the Germanic alliance into some kind of political structure that would be compliant with Roman diplomatic efforts. The most famous of those incursions, led by the Roman emperor Maximinus Thrax, resulted in a Roman victory in 235 AD at the Battle at the Harzhorn Hill, which is located in the modern German state of Lower Saxony, east of the Weser river, between the towns of Kalefeld and Bad Gandersheim. After the Marcomannic Wars, the Romans even managed to occupy the provinces of Marcomannia and Sarmatia, corresponding to modern Czech Republic, Slovakia and Bavaria/Austria/Hungary north of Danube. Final plans to annex those territories were discarded by Commodus deeming the occupation of the region too expensive for the imperial treasury.

After Arminius was defeated and dead, having been murdered in 21 AD by opponents within his own tribe, Rome tried to control Germania beyond the Limes indirectly, by appointing client kings. Italicus, a nephew of Arminius, was appointed king of the Cherusci, Vangio and Sido became vassal princes of the powerful Suebi, and the Quadian client king Vannius was imposed as a ruler of the Marcomanni. Between 91 and 92 during the reign of emperor Domitian, the Romans sent a military detachment to assist their client Lugii against the Suebi in what is now Poland.

Roman controlled territory was limited to the modern states of Austria, Baden-Württemberg, southern Bavaria, southern Hesse, Saarland and the Rhineland as Roman provinces of Noricum, Raetia and Germania. The Roman provinces in western Germany, Germania Inferior (with the capital situated at Colonia Claudia Ara Agrippinensium, modern Cologne) and Germania Superior (with its capital at Mogontiacum, modern Mainz), were formally established in 85 AD, after a long period of military occupation beginning in the reign of the emperor Augustus. Nonetheless, the Severan-era historian Cassius Dio is emphatic that Varus had been conducting the latter stages of full colonization of a greater German province, which has been partially confirmed by recent archaeological discoveries such as the Varian-era Roman provincial settlement at Waldgirmes Forum.

Site of the battle

The theories about the location of the Battle of the Teutoburg Forest have emerged in large numbers especially since the beginning of the 16th century, when the Tacitus works Germania and Annales were rediscovered. The assumptions about the possible place of the battle are based essentially on place names and river names, as well as on the description of the topography by the ancient writers, on investigations of the prehistoric road network, and on archaeological finds. Only a few assumptions are scientifically based theories.

The prehistorian and provincial archaeologist Harald Petrikovits combined the several hundred theories in 1966 into four units:
 according to the northern theory on the northern edge of the Wiehen Hills and Weser Hills
 according to Lippe theory in the eastern half of the Teutoburg Forest or between this and the Weser river
 according to the Münsterland theory south of the Teutoburg Forest near Beckum or just to the east of it and
 according to the southern theory in the hill country southeast of the Westphalian Lowland.

For almost 2,000 years, the site of the battle was unidentified. The main clue to its location was an allusion to the saltus Teutoburgiensis in section i.60–62 of Tacitus' Annals, an area "not far" from the land between the upper reaches of the Lippe and Ems rivers in central Westphalia. During the 19th century, theories as to the site abounded, and the followers of one theory successfully argued for a long wooded ridge called the Osning, near Bielefeld. This was then renamed the Teutoburg Forest.

Late 20th-century research and excavations were sparked by finds by a British amateur archaeologist, Major Tony Clunn, who was casually prospecting at Kalkriese Hill with a metal detector in the hope of finding "the odd Roman coin". He discovered coins from the reign of Augustus (and none later), and some ovoid leaden Roman sling bolts. Kalkriese is a village administratively part of the city of Bramsche, on the north slope fringes of the Wiehen, a ridge-like range of hills in Lower Saxony north of Osnabrück.

Initial systematic excavations were carried out by the archaeological team of the Kulturhistorisches Museum Osnabrück under the direction of Professor Wolfgang Schlüter from 1987. Once the dimensions of the project had become apparent, a foundation was created to organise future excavations and to build and operate a museum on the site, and to centralise publicity and documentation. Since 1990 the excavations have been directed by Susanne Wilbers-Rost.

A long zig-zagging wall of peat turves and packed sand had apparently been constructed beforehand: concentrations of battle debris in front of it and a dearth behind it testify to the Romans' inability to breach the Germanic tribes' strong defence. Human remains appear to corroborate Tacitus' account of the Roman legionaries' later burial. Coins minted with the countermark VAR, distributed by Varus, also support the identification of the site. As a result, Kalkriese is now perceived to be an event of the Battle of the Teutoburg Forest.

The   includes a large outdoor area with trails leading to a re-creation of part of the earthen wall from the battle and other outdoor exhibits. An observation tower, which holds most of the indoor exhibits, allows visitors to get an overview of the battle site. A second building includes the ticket centre, museum store and a restaurant. The museum houses a large number of artefacts found at the site, including fragments of studded sandals legionaries lost, spearheads, and a Roman officer's ceremonial face-mask, which was originally silver-plated.

Alternative theories
Although the majority of evidence has the battle taking place east and north of Osnabrück and the end at Kalkriese Hill, some scholars and others still adhere to older theories. Moreover, there is controversy among Kalkriese adherents themselves as to the details.

The German historians Peter Kehne and Reinhard Wolters believe that the battle was probably in the Detmold area, and that Kalkriese is the site of one of the battles in 15 AD. This theory is, however, in contradiction to Tacitus' account.

A number of authors, including the archaeologists Susanne Wilbers-Rost and Günther Moosbauer, historian Ralf Jahn, and British author Adrian Murdoch (see below), believe that the Roman army approached Kalkriese from roughly due east, from Minden, North Rhine-Westphalia, not from south of the Wiehen Hills (i.e., from Detmold). This would have involved a march along the northern edge of the Wiehen Hills, and the army would have passed through flat, open country, devoid of the dense forests and ravines described by Cassius Dio. Historians such as Gustav-Adolf Lehmann and Boris Dreyer counter that Cassius Dio's description is too detailed and differentiated to be thus dismissed.

Tony Clunn (see below), the discoverer of the battlefield, and a "southern-approach" proponent, believes that the battered Roman army regrouped north of Ostercappeln, where Varus committed suicide, and that the remnants were finally overcome at the Kalkriese Gap.

Based on a reinterpretation of the writings of Tacitus, Paterculus, and Florus and a new analysis of those of Cassius Dio, he proposes that an ambush took place in Varus's summer camp during a peaceful meeting between the Roman commanders and the Germanic leaders.

In popular culture
 The 1736 opera Arminio, by Handel, known as "possibly Handel's weakest opera", glorifies the German chief who routed the Romans at Teutoberg.
 The 1792 historical novel Marcus Flaminius by Cornelia Knight follows a main character who is a survivor of the battle.
 Die Hermannsschlacht is an 1808 drama by Heinrich von Kleist based on the events of the battle.
 Wolves of Rome is a 2016 historical novel by Valerio Massimo Manfredi.
 Barbarians, a German original series detailing the Roman Imperial campaign through Germania in 9 AD, premiered on Netflix in October 2020.

German nationalism

The legacy of the Germanic victory was resurrected with the recovery of the histories of Tacitus in the 15th century, when the figure of Arminius, now known as "Hermann" (a mistranslation of the name "Armin" which has often been incorrectly attributed to Martin Luther), became a nationalistic symbol of Pan-Germanism. From then, Teutoburg Forest has been seen as a pivotal clash that ended Roman expansion into northern Europe. This notion became especially prevalent in the 19th century, when it formed an integral part of the mythology of German nationalism.

In 1808 the German Heinrich von Kleist's play Die Hermannsschlacht aroused anti-Napoleonic sentiment, even though it could not be performed under occupation. In 1847, Josef Viktor von Scheffel wrote a lengthy song, "Als die Römer frech geworden" ("When the Romans got cheeky"), relating the tale of the battle with somewhat gloating humour. Copies of the text are found on many souvenirs available at the Detmold monument.

The battle had a profound effect on 19th-century German nationalism along with the histories of Tacitus; the Germans, at that time still divided into many states, identified with the Germanic peoples as shared ancestors of one "German people" and came to associate the imperialistic Napoleonic French and Austro-Hungarian forces with the invading Romans, destined for defeat.

The location of the site of the Battle bore unique political meaning to the German states during the 19th century. Historian Michael McNally notes that the French had found a hero of the Roman age in Vercingetorix, the commander of the Gallic grand coalition during Gallic Wars. In 1865, they had erected a monument to Vercingétorix at the site of his last stand. Because Julius Caesar had written extensively about the Gallic Wars, the location of the battles of the Gallic Wars were easily found. But Germany, in seeking a similar national hero, found that the site of the Varian Disaster was not so easily placed. A monument to the battle was begun in 1841, outside the town of Detmold, on the nearby summit of Tuetberg. Finished in 1875, the statue atop it looked west, to France, a reflection of the rivalry between the two nations.

As a symbol of unified Romantic nationalism, the Hermannsdenkmal, a monument to Hermann surmounted by a statue, was erected in a forested area near Detmold, believed at that time to be the site of the battle. Paid for largely out of private funds, the monument remained unfinished for decades and was not completed until 1875, after the Franco-Prussian War of 1870–71 unified the country. The completed monument was then a symbol of conservative German nationalism. The battle and the Hermannsdenkmal monument are commemorated by the similar Hermann Heights Monument in New Ulm, Minnesota, US, erected by the Sons of Hermanni, a support organisation for German immigrants to the United States. Hermann, Missouri, claims Hermann (Arminius) as its namesake and a third statue of Hermann was dedicated there in a ceremony on 24 September 2009, celebrating the 2,000th anniversary of the battle.

According to journalist David Crossland, "The old nationalism has been replaced by an easy-going patriotism that mainly manifests itself at sporting events like the soccer World Cup."

Paintings of the 19th century

See also

 Clades Lolliana
 List of ancient Germanic peoples
 Demise of Legio XXII Deiotariana
 Battle of Cannae
 Battle of Carrhae

Notes

References

Sources

Ancient sources

 Ovid, Tristia (Sorrows), poetic verses written in 10 and 11 AD
 Marcus Manilius, Astronomica, a poem written early in the first century AD
 Strabo, Geographia 7:1.4, geographically themed history, written around 18 AD
 Marcus Velleius Paterculus, Roman History 2:117–120, written in 30 AD
 Tacitus, Annals 1.3, 1.10, 1.43, 1.55–71, 2.7, 2.41, 2.45, 2.88, a history written in 109 AD
 Suetonius, Lives of the Twelve Caesars: Augustus 23, Tiberius 17–18, biographies written in 121 AD
 Florus, Epitome de T. Livio Bellorum omnium annorum DCC Libri duo 2:30, history/panegyric, written in the early second century AD
 Dio Cassius, Roman History 56:18–24, written in the first half of the third century AD
 Seneca the Younger, "Epistulae Morales ad Lucilium," referenced in Letter 47, Section 10

20th century

 Gesa von Essen, Hermannsschlachten. Germanen- und Römerbilder in der Literatur des 18. und 19. Jahrhunderts. Wallstein Verlag, Göttingen 1998,   (Hermann Battles. Images of Teutons and Romans in the literature of the 18th and 19th centuries.)
 Wolfgang Schlüter (Ed.), Römer im Osnabrücker Land. Die archäologischen Untersuchungen in der Kalkrieser-Niewedder Senke. Rasch, Bramsche 1991,   (Romans in the Osnabrück District. The archaeological excavations in the Kalkriese-Niewedde depression.)
 Edward Shepherd Creasy, Germans under Arminius Revolt Against Rome in The Great Events by Famous Historians, Vol. 2, compilation of historical essays published in 1905

21st century
 Ancient Warfare special "The Varian Disaster", June 2009 (essays by various authors, including Clunn and Murdoch)
 Fergus M. Bordewich, "The ambush that changed history" in Smithsonian Magazine, September 2005, pp. 74–81.
 Wilm Brepohl, Neue Überlegungen zur Varusschlacht. Aschendorff, Münster 2004,   (Reconsidering the Varus Battle.)
 
 Tony Clunn, The Quest for the Lost Roman Legions, Savas Beatie LLC, 2005, 372 pp. . The late author discovered the battlefield. This book is a combination of the account of his discovery, the artifacts he found, and his theory about the course of the battle, with that portion recounted in fictional style built around the history.
 
 
 Boris Dreyer, Arminius und der Untergang des Varus. Warum die Germanen keine Römer wurden. Klett-Cotta, Stuttgart 2009,   (Arminius and the downfall of Varus. Why the Teutons did not become Romans.)
 
 
 
 Joachim Harnecker, Arminius, Varus und das Schlachtfeld von Kalkriese. Eine Einführung in die archäologischen Arbeiten und ihre Ergebnisse. 2nd ed. Rasch, Bramsche 2002   (Arminius, Varus and the battlefield of Kalkriese. An introduction to the archaeological work and its results.)
 Ralf Günter Jahn, Der Römisch-Germanische Krieg (9–16 n. Chr.). Dissertation, Bonn 2001  (The Roman-Germanic war (9–16 AD).)
 Johann-Sebastian Kühlborn, "Auf dem Marsch in die Germania Magna. Roms Krieg gegen die Germanen". In: Martin Müller, Hans-Joahim Schalles und Norbert Zieling (Eds.), Colonia Ulpia Traiana. Xanten und sein Umland in römischer Zeit. Zabern, Mainz 2008, S. 67–91.  ("On the march into Germania Magna. Rome's war against the Germanic tribes".)
 Fabian Link, Die Zeitdetektive. Die Falle im Teutoburger Wald: Ein Krimi aus der Römerzeit.  Ravensburger, 2010, .  (The time detectives. The events in the Teutoburg Forest: a crime story of Roman times.) (youth fiction)
 Ralf-Peter Märtin, Die Varusschlacht. Rom und die Germanen. S. Fischer Verlag, Frankfurt am Main 2008,   (The Varus Battle. Rome and the Germanic tribes.)
 
 Günther Moosbauer, Die Varusschlacht. Beck'sche Reihe, Verlag C. H. Beck Wissen, München 2009,   (The Varus Battle.)
 
 
 
 Paweł Rochala, Las Teutoburski 9 rok n.e.  Bellona, Warszawa, 2005.
 Michael Sommer, Die Arminiusschlacht. Spurensuche im Teutoburger Wald. Stuttgart 2009  (The Arminius Battle. Search for traces in the Teutoburg Forest.)
 Dieter Timpe, Römisch-germanische Begegnung in der späten Republik und frühen Kaiserzeit. Voraussetzungen – Konfrontationen – Wirkungen. Gesammelte Studien. Saur, München & Leipzig, 2006,   (Roman-Germanic encounter in the late Republic and early Empire. Conditions – Confrontations – Effects. Collected Studies.)
 
  Strong on archaeology; "Florus"-based theory.
 Peter Oppitz, Das Geheimnis der Varusschlacht. Zadara-Verlag, 2006,   (The mystery of the Varus Battle.) Paderborn would have been the site of the battle.
 
 
 Rainer Wiegels (ed.), Die Varusschlacht. Wendepunkt der Geschichte? Theiss, Stuttgart 2007,   (The Varus Battle. Turning point of history?)
 Reinhard Wolters, Die Römer in Germanien. 5th ed. Verlag C.H. Beck, München 2006,   (The Romans in Germania.)
 Reinhard Wolters, Die Schlacht im Teutoburger Wald. Arminius, Varus und das römische Germanien. München 2008,   (The Battle of the Teutoburg Forest. Arminius, Varus and Roman Germania.)

External links
 Fergus M. Bordewich: "The Ambush That Changed History" Smithsonian Magazine, September 2005
 Official site of the Kalkriese foundation
 Jona Lendering, The Battle in the Teutoburg Forest at livius.org
 Arminius / Varus. Die Varusschlacht im Jahre 9 n. Chr. , Internet-Portal Westfälische Geschichte, LWL – Institut für westfälische Regionalgeschichte, Münster 
 Student project site by Universität Osnabrück 
 Varusbattle in Netherland 

 
1st-century battles
0s conflicts
0s in the Roman Empire
AD 9
Ambushes in Europe
Arminius
Augustus
Battles involving Germanic peoples
Battles involving the Roman Empire
Cherusci
History of Europe
Germania
Germanic paganism
Marsi (Germanic)
Night battles
Roman campaigns in Germania (12 BC – AD 16)
Wiehen Hills